Namkom railway station, station code NKM, is the railway station serving the capital city of Ranchi in the Ranchi district in the Indian state of Jharkhand. Namkom station belongs to the Ranchi division of the South Eastern Railway zone of the Indian Railways.

Ranchi has trains running frequently to Delhi and Kolkata. Many important trains start from Ranchi Junction as well.

Facilities 
The major facilities available are waiting rooms, vehicle parking, etc. The vehicles are allowed to enter the station premises. Security personnel from the Government Railway Police (G.R.P.) are present for security.

Platforms
There are three platforms which are interconnected with foot overbridge (FOB).

Trains 
Several electrified local passenger trains also run from Ranchi to neighbouring destinations on frequent intervals. Many passenger and express trains serve  Namkon Station.

Nearest airport
The nearest airport to Namkon Station is Birsa Munda Airport, Ranchi

See also 
 Ranchi

References

External links 

 Namkon Station Map
 Official website of the Ranchi district

Railway stations in Ranchi district
Transport in Ranchi
Buildings and structures in Ranchi
Ranchi railway division